Arthur "Art" Matthew Longsjo Jr. (October 23, 1931 – September 16, 1958) was an American Olympian speed skater and cyclist. He was the first American to compete in the Summer and Winter Olympics in the same year.

Biography

Longsjo was born in Fitchburg, Massachusetts. In 1953, he won the 1 mile, 3 mile, and 25 mile races at the Massachusetts State Cycling Championships after riding his bicycle 1.5 hours to the race (from Fitchburg to Westborough, Massachusetts). In 1954, he won the Quebec-Montreal Road Race and was named the Canadian Cyclist of the Year. He won the race again in 1956.

Longsjo won the 5,000 m speed skating event at the United States national championships to make the Olympic team at the Winter Olympics. In 1956, he competed in both the Winter Olympics as a speed skater and the Summer Olympics as a cyclist. Due to a knee injury before the games, he placed outside the medal stand. Longsjo was the first American to compete in both the Winter and Summer Olympics in the same year.

In 1958 Longsjo won three races, the Tour of Somerville, the Tour du St. Laurent stage race and the Quebec-Montreal Road Race.

Longsjo died in 1958 following a car accident in Burlington, Vermont. He had been returning from the Quebec-Montreal Road Race.

Awards and honors
In 1960 the Fitchburg Longsjo Classic was held in Fitchburg in memory of Longsjo. The race was a road bicycle racing stage race that was held annually until 2019. On March 18, 2020, event organizers announced that the event was being retired.

Longsjo was inducted into the National Speedskating Hall of Fame in 1970, and the U.S. Bicycling Hall of Fame in 1988.

References

External links
 Fitchburg Longsjo Classic (official site)

1931 births
1958 deaths
American male cyclists
American male speed skaters
Olympic speed skaters of the United States
Olympic cyclists of the United States
Speed skaters at the 1956 Winter Olympics
Cyclists at the 1956 Summer Olympics
Sportspeople from Fitchburg, Massachusetts
Road incident deaths in Vermont
American track cyclists
1958 road incidents
Cyclists from Massachusetts